Branney is a surname. Notable people with the surname include:

Craig Branney (born 1982), English motorcycle speedway rider
John Branney (born 1985), English motorcycle speedway rider, brother of Craig